Yoshimi Futamura is a Japanese ceramic artist who has worked and lived in France since 1986 . She was born in 1959, in Nagoya, Aichi Prefecture.

Biography and Accomplishments 

She studied in Japan at the School of Ceramic Art in Seto, Aichi from 1979–82, and is a graduate of the Centre Artisanal de Ceramic de L’Ecole Duperre in Paris. Her work resides with the collection of the Harn Museum of Art, the AIC Ariana Museum in Geneva, the Yale University Art Gallery, and The Brooklyn Museum. She was one of five leading female ceramic artists featured in a show at Joan Mirviss Gallery in NYC, entitled, "The French Connection: Five Japanese Women Ceramicists and a Passion for France”.

Gender in Japanese Ceramics 

Within the global art market, Futamura's work references both modern and classical themes in Japanese ceramics. Her use of naturally occurring, organic textures are combined with traditional shapes, creating unique works of art. Her role within Japanese ceramics is also nontraditional, as women are excluded from the apprentice system of ceramic production. As a result, Futamura's work is both sculptural and functional, but emphasizes self-expression as a fundamental part of her artistic practice. The shift in gender roles occurred post-World War II, marking the development of independent female artists. As secondary education became more open to a wider audience, women were able to study ceramics through universities, rather than entering the apprenticeship system.  While Futamura's work in France may be read as indicating the importance of globalization within contemporary artistic practice, it is also important to indicate that her training occurred within a country with a long running history of ceramic arts produced by both men and women.

Work and Ethos 

Futamura's work is often inspired by nature, but reflects the natural kiln effects. The texture of her work may appear burned, crushed, creased, charred, or speckled with fine granules. Her materials, from porcelain to terracotta are used to create forms that often appear biomorphic, irregular and almost sexual. In an interview, she mentioned that her work showcases the materiality of her medium, earth.  Futamura's artwork can be read within the concept of wabi sabi, or imperfect, incomplete beauty.  The irregularity of her pieces only increases their meditative quality.

References

External links 
Website : yoshimifutamura.com

1959 births
Living people
Japanese ceramists